The 1984 Tournament of the Americas, since 2005 called the FIBA Americas Championship or FIBA AmeriCup, was the 2nd edition of this basketball tournament, hosted in Sao Paulo, Brazil from 15–24 May 1984. The outcome would determine the three berths allocated to the Americas for the 1984 Los Angeles Summer Olympics and five berths for the 1986 FIBA World Championship in Spain.  The United States did not participate in the tournament, claiming host-courtesy. Brazil was undefeated in the round robin tournament and were accompanied to the Olympic games by Canada and Uruguay.

Qualification
Eight teams promoted from the respective zone tournaments in 1982 and 1983 to the 1984 tournament; Canada qualified automatically since they are one of only two members of the North America zone. Venezuela withdrew from the tournament. The teams formed a single group of nine teams.

North America: 
Caribbean and Central America:, 

Format
The top three teams from the main group earned berths in the 1984 Los Angeles Summer Olympic games and for the 1986 FIBA World Championship to be held in Spain. The fourth and fifth teams in the main group also earned berths to the 1986 FIBA World Championship.

Squads

Preliminary round

|}

References
 1984 American Olympic Qualifying Tournament for Men, FIBA.com.

FIBA AmeriCup
1984 in Brazilian sport
International basketball competitions hosted by Uruguay
1983–84 in North American basketball
1983–84 in South American basketball